Trudy Young (born January 1, 1950) is a Canadian actress.

Born in Ontario, Canada, her career began in 1963 with appearances on CBC's Time of Your Life. She became a regular host of Razzle Dazzle in 1965 while attending school at Alderwood Collegiate. She appeared in films throughout the 1970s and 1980s such as Face-Off (1971). In 1979 Young was hired to supply the voice of the groupie on the track "One of My Turns" from Pink Floyd's album The Wall. She was nominated as best supporting actress in the 4th Genie Awards for her role in the film Melanie (1982).

Filmography

Feature films

Television series

Post-career
Young retired from acting in 1982 and is now living in Oshawa, Ontario. In August 2010, she underwent a second back surgery for a chronic back ailment that had worsened as the result of two car accidents.

References

External links

Living people
Canadian child actresses
Canadian film actresses
Canadian television actresses
Year of birth uncertain
1950s births